Federal Highway 17 (Fed. 17 ) is a free part of the federal highways corridors of Mexico. The route runs from the Mexico – United States border at Agua Prieta, Sonora south to Moctezuma. The northern terminus of Fed. 17 transitions north into the United States at Douglas, Arizona as U.S. Route 191. The total length of the highway is about 169 km (105 mi).

References

017